Three Singles to Adventure (American title: Three Tickets to Adventure) is the second book by British naturalist Gerald Durrell about trips collecting animals for zoos. It is the chronicle of a six-month collecting trip in 1950 to the South American country of British Guyana, now Guyana. Adventure was the name of a town.

Durrell wrote books to pay for his expeditions and, later, his conservation efforts. His first book The Overloaded Ark was a huge success, with its mix of comic exaggeration and serious natural observations, leading him to follow up with other accounts. 

1954 books